Agrimonia (from the Greek ), commonly known as agrimony, is a genus of 12–15 species of perennial herbaceous flowering plants in the family Rosaceae, native to the temperate regions of the Northern Hemisphere, with one species also in Africa.

Agrimonia species are used as food plants by the larvae of some Lepidoptera species including grizzled skipper (recorded on A. eupatoria) and large grizzled skipper.

Species
Agrimonia eupatoria – Common agrimony (Europe, Asia, Africa)
Agrimonia gryposepala – Common agrimony, tall hairy agrimony (North America)
Agrimonia incisa – Incised agrimony (North America)
Agrimonia coreana – Korean agrimony (eastern Asia)
Agrimonia microcarpa – Smallfruit agrimony (North America)
Agrimonia nipponica – Japanese agrimony (eastern Asia)
Agrimonia parviflora – Harvestlice agrimony (North America)
Agrimonia pilosa – Hairy agrimony (eastern Europe, Asia)
Agrimonia procera – Fragrant agrimony (Europe)
Agrimonia pubescens – Soft or downy agrimony (North America)
Agrimonia repens – Short agrimony (southwest Asia)
Agrimonia rostellata – Beaked agrimony (North America)
Agrimonia striata – Roadside agrimony (North America)

Uses
In ancient times, it was used for foot baths and tired feet. Agrimony has a long history of medicinal use. The English poet Michael Drayton once hailed it as an "all-heal" and through the ages it was considered a panacea. The ancient Greeks used agrimony to treat eye ailments, and it was made into brews for diarrhea and disorders of the gallbladder, liver, and kidneys. The Anglo-Saxons boiled agrimony in milk and used it to improve erectile performance.
They also made a solution from the leaves and seeds for healing wounds; this use continued through the Middle Ages and afterward, in a preparation called eau d'arquebusade, or "musket-shot water". It has been added to tea as a spring tonic.

Folklore
Traditional British folklore states that if a sprig of Agrimonia eupatoria was placed under a person's head, they would sleep until it was removed.

See also
 Aremonia agrimonioides (Bastard-agrimony, of the related genus Aremonia)
 Eupatorium cannabinum (Hemp-agrimony)

References

External links

 Herb Forum Agrimony Thread

 
Medicinal plants
Agrimoniinae
Rosaceae genera
Taxa named by Joseph Pitton de Tournefort